Kim Lee may refer to:

Kim Lee-sub (1974–), South Korean football player 
Lee Kim Sai (1938–2019), Malaysian politician
Kim Lee, nom de plume of Steven L. Heston, American mathematician, economist, financier and gambling researcher
Lee Kim Lai (1960–1978), Singapore police officer who was abducted and murdered
Lee Ann Kim, Korean American anchor for the San Diego, California, ABC television affiliate; activist for the Asian American community
Kim Hugh Lee ( Cijimpi) Zulu name .
South African born law enforcement officer for 32 years. Articles in printed media as well as television , specialty vehicle crime.

See also
Lee (Korean name)
Li (surname)